Children's Cancer Institute is an Australian medical research institute wholly dedicated to the prevention and treatment of childhood cancer.

The Institute's vision is to save the lives of all children with cancer and improve the quality of life for survivors. It has been led by Professor Michelle Haber  since its establishment.

History 

In 1975, Jack Kasses and John Lough met in the waiting room of Sydney Children's Hospital where their daughter and son respectively were undergoing treatment for leukaemia. Lough approached the Apex Club in Wollongong to raise money for cancer research. They started the "Help a Kid Make It" campaign – with a target of $1 million to facilitate research into childhood cancer.

The Children's Leukaemia and Cancer Foundation was established in May 1976. The foundation evolved into Children's Cancer Institute, which opened its own research laboratories in 1984. The first scientists to join the Institute were Haber, who is now the Executive Director, Murray Norris , now the Deputy Director, and Maria Kavallaris, now Program Head, Tumour Biology & Targeting.

Research focus 
The Institute is grouped into four main research units focused on the prevention and treatment of childhood cancer and include understanding childhood cancer, improving diagnosis, finding better treatments, and improving life after cancer.

Achievements 
 Launched Zero Childhood Cancer program for the most serious cases of infant, childhood and adolescent cancer 
 Researchers showed a recently developed drug to have potential against an aggressive subtype of acute lymphoblastic leukaemia
 Scientists identified a critical molecular 'feedback loop' that helps initiate and drive neuroblastoma, and an experimental drug with the potential to interrupt the loop and halt tumour progression
 Opened a new international clinical trial for aggressive relapsed neuroblastoma
 A novel test developed that doubled the survival rate from 35 per cent to 70 per cent for high-risk acute lymphoblastic leukaemia

Fundraising initiatives 
Scott Cam was an ambassador for the initiative.

The Institute is also the beneficiary of many events held annually throughout Australia.

See also

Health in Australia

References

External links

Medical research institutes in Sydney
1976 establishments in Australia
Cancer organisations based in Australia
Research institutes established in 1976
University of New South Wales
Pediatric organizations